The 2011–12 Ford Trophy was the 41st season of the official List A domestic cricket competition in New Zealand. This season was the first in a sponsorship deal between New Zealand Cricket and Ford Motor Company. The competition ran from 25 November 2011 to 12 February 2012, and was won by the Central Districts Stags.

Teams 
 Auckland Aces
 Northern Districts Knights
 Central Districts Stags
 Wellington Firebirds
 Canterbury Wizards
 Otago Volts

Grounds

Points Table

Results

25 November 2011

4 December 2011

7 December 2011

11 December 2011

14 December 2011

26 January 2012

29 January 2012

1 February 2012

5 February 2012 – 1st and 2nd Preliminary Finals

8 February 2012 – 3rd Preliminary Final

12 February 2012 – Final

See also 
 Ford Trophy

References 
1. https://web.archive.org/web/20130212191232/http://www.blackcaps.co.nz/_upload/series-schedules/The-Ford-Trophy-2011-12.pdf Retrieved 06/07/2012.
2. https://web.archive.org/web/20111231205345/http://www.blackcaps.co.nz/domestic/the-ford-trophy/112/schedule.aspx Retrieved 06/07/2012.
3. https://web.archive.org/web/20120630052656/http://www.blackcaps.co.nz/domestic/points-table/112/ford-trophy.aspx Retrieved 06/07/2012.
4. http://www.espncricinfo.com/ci/engine/series/526615.html. Retrieved 14 September 2012.
5. http://www.espncricinfo.com/ci/engine/series/526615.html?view=records Retrieved 14 September 2012.

External links 
 www.blackcaps.co.nz

Ford Trophy
Ford Trophy
2011–12 New Zealand cricket season